Beyond the Glory is a documentary series that profiles some of the most legendary and controversial athletes in recent history. Executive produced by Steve Michaels and Frank Sinton and narrated by Jay Mohr, and later by Roy Firestone, the show used stock footage, on-camera interviews, and photographs of the athletes' lives, who grew up.

The series was produced by Asylum Entertainment.

Athletes
The series had delved into the lives of such athletes as Mike Tyson in a special two-hour Emmy-nominated episode, and also conducted in-depth interviews with some sports notables.
Athletes profiled include:

External links
 
 Fox Sports Net

Fox Sports Networks original programming
2001 American television series debuts
2006 American television series endings
2000s American documentary television series